Wünsdorf-Waldstadt is a railway station in the town of Wünsdorf, Brandenburg, Germany, on the Berlin–Dresden railway, with services operated by Deutsche Bahn.

Train services
The station is served by the following services:

Regional services : Berlin –   – Wünsdorf-Waldstadt – Luckau-Uckro – Doberlug-Kirchhain – Elsterwerda
Regional services :  BER Airport – Terminal 1-2 – Wünsdorf-Waldstadt

References

External links
VBB website
Berlin-Brandenburg (VBB) network map

Railway stations in Brandenburg
Buildings and structures in Teltow-Fläming
Railway stations in Germany opened in 1897